Eric Thio Ging Hwie, Indonesianized as Wibowo Susetio, (29 November 1923 - 4 June 1989) was an Indonesian weightlifter. He competed in the men's lightweight event at the 1952 Summer Olympics.

He was the first Chinese Indonesian sportsman to compete at the Olympic Games, when he took part in 1952 Summer Olympics in Helsinki, the first Olympics attended by Indonesia.

References

External links
 

1923 births
1989 deaths
Indonesian male weightlifters
Olympic weightlifters of Indonesia
Weightlifters at the 1952 Summer Olympics
Place of birth missing
Asian Games medalists in weightlifting
Weightlifters at the 1954 Asian Games
Medalists at the 1954 Asian Games
Asian Games bronze medalists for Indonesia
Indonesian people of Chinese descent
20th-century Indonesian people